Fallsburg is a hamlet and census-designated place (CDP) in the town of Fallsburg in Sullivan County, New York, United States. It was first listed as a CDP prior to the 2020 census.

The community is in eastern Sullivan County, in the center of the town of Fallsburg. It is bordered to the south by South Fallsburg and to the north by Woodbourne. The Neversink River, a tributary of the Delaware River, flows from north to south through the community. New York State Route 42 passes through the community, following the west side of the Neversink.

Demographics

References 

Census-designated places in Sullivan County, New York
Census-designated places in New York (state)